Quetta is a rural locality in the Isaac Region, Queensland, Australia.

History 
The name Quetta comes from the Quetta parish.

The locality was created on 16 February 2018 by excising land from the localities of Mistake Creek and Peak Vale.

Road infrastructure
The Clermont-Alpha Road runs through from north-east to west.

References 

Isaac Region
Localities in Queensland